Maurice Doreal (1898 –  1963), born Claude Doggins, was an American occultist and founder of the Brotherhood of the White Temple.

Occult views
Maurice Doreal claimed that in 1925, he went to the Great Pyramids of Giza and discovered the Emerald Tablets of Thoth, a king of Atlantis (not to be confused with Emerald Tablet). He then claimed that he had "translated" the text.

In around 1930, Doreal formed the Brotherhood of the White Temple in Denver, having been involved in Theosophy. He claimed that in 1931, in Los Angeles, he met two Atlanteans who took him to a cave underneath Mount Shasta. Doreal quickly developed a cosmology focused on the inner earth, describing "underground races" he claimed to have learned about from the Atlanteans. Doreal developed theories of an underground serpent race. During the 1950s, Doreal incorporated aliens into his views. He combined these all into a theory that in the second half of the 20th century, the serpent race would ally with the Antichrist. He believed that there were "three types of flying saucers including one piloted by 'serpent people' who were once ice-bound in Siberia, became defrosted and then replaced and overthrew the Communist regime in Russia".

In the late 1940s and early 1950s, Doreal relocated the Brotherhood near Sedalia, Colorado, where he predicted that nuclear war would happen in 1953, but that him and his community would be protected by the mountains in the valley they relocated to. He died in 1963.

References

Citations

Bibliography

External links 

 Text of the "Emerald Tablets of Thoth the Atlantean" at Alchemylab.com
 Text of the "Emerald Tablets of Thoth" at Crystalinks.com

American conspiracy theorists
American Theosophists
Atlantis proponents
Pseudoscience